Copa del Rey Juvenil de Fútbol is a youth football tournament in Spain, which is contested by sixteen teams from the División de Honor Juvenil. It is organised by the RFEF.

History
The Copa del Rey Juvenil de Fútbol was founded in 1951 with the name of Copa del Generalísimo. Its name was changed in 1977 to Copa del Rey.

Finals

‡ The title decided by lower age of the players.
* Was scheduled to be played at the Estadio Cartagonova in Cartagena

Champions

See also
 RFEF
 Copa de Campeones Juvenil de Fútbol
 Copa del Rey

Notes and references

External links
 RFEF site
 RSSSF

 
División de Honor Juvenil de Fútbol
Juvenil
Youth football in Spain